John Randolph Anthony (21 January 1890 – 10 July 1954) was a Welsh National Hunt jockey. He was the sixth son of a horse-racing family, owners of the Cilfeithy Stud Farm in Llandyfaelog, Carmarthenshire, from where his older brothers Ivor and Owen also became, respectively, a successful jockey and a National Hunt trainer.

An amateur until 1921, Jack rode his first winner in 1906, and was best known for his three victories in the Grand National steeplechase: on "Glenside" in 1911, on "Ally Sloper" in 1915, and on "Troytown" in 1920. He was the sixth jockey to win three Grand Nationals, and he also finished third in the 1925 event. He was champion jockey on two occasions, in 1914 and 1928. In the latter year, he retired from riding to become a trainer. His biggest success in this role was with Easter Hero, which won the Cheltenham Gold Cup in 1929 and 1930.

Jack died in 1954 at Manor Farm House in Letcombe Regis, Berkshire. In 1991 he was included in the Welsh Sports Hall of Fame.

Sources
Brief biography

1890 births
1954 deaths
British racehorse trainers
Welsh jockeys
British Champion jumps jockeys